Nemanja Cvetković (born 3 January 1996) is a Serbian football defender who plays for Voždovac.

Club career

Sloboda Užice
He made his professional debut for Sloboda on 27 April 2013, in Serbian SuperLiga match versus FK Rad, at the age of 16. He played last 5 minutes on that match. On 4 February 2014,during a training session Cvetković broke both his Tibia and Fibula after a challenge with Dino Dolmagić. Coach Ljubiša Stamenković said that he would miss the rest of the season.

Voždovac
On 2 July 2021, he signed a three-year contract with Voždovac.

Career statistics

References

External links
 

1996 births
Living people
Sportspeople from Užice
Serbian footballers
Association football defenders
FK Sloboda Užice players
FK Čukarički players
FK BASK players
FK Jedinstvo Užice players
FK Kolubara players
FK Voždovac players
Serbian SuperLiga players
Serbian First League players